Samuel Ernest "Sammy", Baron van Tuyll van Serooskerken (born 10 October 1951 in Velp) is a Dutch politician and a member of the Dutch nobility. He was co-founder of the Liberal Democratic Party (Liberaal Democratische Partij, abbr. "LibDem")  and was head of list for this party in the 2006 and 2012 Parliament elections.

Education 
After his secondary education, van Tuyll studied Medicine at the University of Groningen. After graduating in medicine in 1976, he studied economics and law at the University of Amsterdam, in which he graduated in 1983 and 1987 respectively.

Career

After a career at the Dutch Central Bank De Nederlandsche Bank and the Ministry of Finance, van Tuyll worked in Brussels from 1994 to 2001; he was Economic Advisor at the European Commission.

Politics 
Van Tuyll is a co-founder of Liberal Democratic Party (Liberaal Democratische Partij).

Personal 
Van Tuyll is married and has six children.

See also 
 List of Dutch politicians

References

External links 
LibDem.nl: Liberaal Democratische Partij
Genealogy

1951 births
Living people
Barons of the Netherlands
Leaders of political parties in the Netherlands
People from Rheden
People's Party for Freedom and Democracy politicians
University of Amsterdam alumni
University of Groningen alumni